The Orange and Alexandria Railroad (O&A) was a railroad in Virginia, United States. Chartered in 1848, it eventually extended from Alexandria to Gordonsville, with another section from Charlottesville to Lynchburg. The road played a crucial role in the American Civil War, saw the first of many mergers in 1867, and eventually became an important part of the modern-day Norfolk Southern rail system.

Antebellum period 
The Virginia General Assembly issued a charter to the O&A on May 28, 1848, to run from Alexandria to Gordonsville. Construction began in 1850 and was completed in April 1854, when it connected with the Virginia Central Railroad in Orange County. Its longtime president was John S. Barbour Jr., a Virginia lawyer, part-time delegate and son of U.S. Representative John Strode Barbour.

In 1854, the General Assembly granted the O&A the right to build southward from Charlottesville to Lynchburg. O&A paid for trackage rights over Virginia Central tracks from Gordonsville to Charlottesville. In 1860, the southern extension was completed, including lucrative connections to the Virginia and Tennessee Railroad and the South Side Railroad. The O&A also connected with the Manassas Gap Railroad (chartered in 1850), at Tudor Hall (today named Manassas for this junction) which gave it access to the Shenandoah Valley.

The railroad boosted Virginia commerce. Farmers from Virginia's Piedmont region, and later, the Shenandoah Valley could more cheaply ship their products, produce, and goods to the markets of Washington, D.C., and Richmond, and to ocean-going vessels berthed at the Potomac River port of Alexandria. Alexandria, Richmond, and Lynchburg also became manufacturing centers. Passengers could travel from Washington to Lynchburg in eight hours instead of enduring a three-day stagecoach journey.

American Civil War 

The O&A was strategically important during the Civil War (1861–1865) and was repeatedly fought over and wrecked. In connection with the Virginia Central, it was the only rail link between the belligerents' capitals at Washington and Richmond. An 1861 Union Army attempt to gain control of Manassas Junction led to the First Battle of Bull Run, and the junction traded hands numerous times during the war. Confederate Maj. Gen. Thomas J. "Stonewall" Jackson attacked it in the Battle of Manassas Station Operations to draw the Union into the 1862 Second Battle of Bull Run. The 1863 Battle of Brandy Station and Second Battle of Rappahannock Station were also fought near the railroad line.

Reconstruction 
The railroad entered Reconstruction in dire shape, with much of its track ripped up and most of its rolling stock destroyed. However, Barbour rebuilt the railroad with the help of various politically connected financiers and his brother-in-law J.S.B. Thompson. In 1867, the O&A merged with the Manassas Gap Railroad (led by Edward Carrington Marshall) to become the Orange, Alexandria and Manassas Railroad.

After the Panic of 1873, the railroad was consolidated into the Virginia Midland Railway, which was controlled by the Baltimore and Ohio Railroad. It later became part of the Richmond and Danville Railroad, which went bankrupt in the Panic of 1893. The following year it was merged into the Southern Railway.

A cutoff between Orange and Charlottesville was incorporated in 1876 as the Charlottesville and Rapidan Railroad and opened in 1880. The Southern Railway acquired the line in 1914.

Modern times 

Most of the O&A is now the Washington District line of the Norfolk Southern Railway.  The main exceptions are a short segment between Orange and Gordonsville, which is part of the similarly named Washington Subdivision of the Buckingham Branch Railroad; and the easternmost portion that traveled through Old Town Alexandria to its waterfront, which no longer exists aside from the Hoofs Run Bridge and the Wilkes Street Tunnel. 

In addition to freight, the former O&A tracks are also used by Amtrak and Virginia Railway Express (VRE) operates commuter railroad service along a portion of the historic line.

See also
Rapidan Passenger Depot

References

External links

Csiegel's Orange & Alexandria Railroad page
1948 photo of Springfield Station
Fairfax Station Railroad Museum
Virginia Railroad Cities
Civil War photographs of the Orange & Alexandria at the Library of Congress
1851 map
1854 map
1861 map
"Map of Warrenton Junction, Orange and Alexandria R.R., Virginia shewing destruction of R.R. by enemy, October 1863."

Defunct Virginia railroads
Predecessors of the Southern Railway (U.S.)
Railway companies established in 1848
Railway companies disestablished in 1867
1848 establishments in Virginia
1867 disestablishments in Virginia
American companies established in 1848
American companies disestablished in 1867